Karjat (Pronunciation: [kəɾd͡zət̪]) is a city administered under a Municipal Council in Raigad district in the Indian state of Maharashtra. It is served by Karjat railway station. Karjat forms a part of the Mumbai Metropolitan Region. The river Ulhas flows through the city.

Gallery

References

External links 

 Karjat, Government of Maharashtra

Cities and towns in Raigad district